Raid: Shadow Legends is a freemium mobile role-playing game developed and published by Israeli game developer Plarium Games, a subsidiary of the gambling company Aristocrat Leisure. A port to PC was released on January 21, 2020.

Gameplay

Raid: Shadow Legends is a fantasy-themed, turn-based role-playing gacha game. The game's story takes place in the fictional realm of Teleria, which has been subjugated by the Dark Lord Siroth. Players take the role of an ancient Telerian warrior resurrected to defeat the Dark Lord and restore peace and harmony to the territory. Players must assemble an army for battles in settings such as castles, dungeons, deserts and temples defended by enemies and possible allies. Throughout the game, players accumulate Shards, vessels containing the souls of past warriors. Shards come in four types with different properties. The game has two forms of currency: Silver, which is relatively easy to come by, and Gems, which are a lot more difficult to acquire. There is also a cost in Energy for running any of the campaign and dungeon stages. Without Energy you can't progress in the campaign. It runs out quickly, and after the first day players will have to be very careful not to waste it.

The game consists primarily of story-driven single-player campaign with twelve levels, each level made up of seven stages with four levels of difficulty. The single-player campaign is interconnected with a multiplayer component, the Arena, to decide player rankings. Players can also join Clans, through which members fight a Clan Boss together, which brings advanced rewards. The games slogan is "Let's Play Together."

The game's narrative was written by Paul C. R. Monk, and the game adopts a Western art style, and settings inspired by dark fantasy.

Reception
Raid: Shadow Legends has been praised for its graphics but criticized for its aggressive monetization in the form of microtransactions. 

Pocket Gamer commended the "sheer graphic quality", for its "beautifully rendered and animated" characters and a "generous experience for new players". TheGamer heavily criticized the game, citing its lack of depth and freemium structure, describing it as "the epitome of pay to win". Gamezebo praised the game for trading "the typical anime-style visuals for a more realistic, dark fantasy look", going on to write about "the truly stunning experience, with some of the finest attack animations and environmental effects we’ve seen in the genre so far." However, the article also criticises the game's underlying monetization, pointing out that progress is difficult, "particularly if you don’t plan on spending any actual money on the various upgrades". In its review, BlueStacks also praised the visuals, saying, "The animations are simply spectacular, with the quality the likes you seldom see in these games," and concluding that "players that enjoy fantasy combat with a more realistic approach—similar to The Lord of the Rings—will likely have a very good time with Raid: Shadow Legends." South African technology website htxt.africa praised the graphics, but overall found it boring with too many microtransactions. Droid Gamers said it brings nothing new to the gacha RPG genre.

Internet meme
The game has received substantial attention for its aggressive advertising campaign, most notably its sponsorships of a number of YouTube, Twitch and Vimeo content creators, leading it to become an Internet meme.

Sponsorships and advertising
In February 2020, two tweets from a Plarium customer support agent on Raids Twitter feed, claiming that Raid does not sponsor but rather "cooperates" with YouTube creators, gaining online attention for its violations of FTC rules requiring payments for endorsements to be disclosed to the public. Various creators contradicted this tweet, openly stating that either were they sponsored by Raid or have received offers from Plarium involving Raid-related sponsorship deals. Plarium later posted a tweet stating the tweets were referring to tutorials and Raid-focused videos, not its marketing campaign.

References

External links
 

2010s fads and trends
2018 video games
Advertising and marketing controversies
Android (operating system) games
Fantasy video games
Free-to-play video games
Gacha games
Internet memes introduced in 2018
IOS games
Online games
Role-playing video games
Video games developed in Israel
YouTube sponsors
Plarium games